Iran men's national inline hockey team is the national team side of Iran at international inline hockey.

Current Staff
Head Coach:   Kaveh Sedghi 
Team Manager:   Payam Dastyar

Tournaments

Asian Roller Skating Championship - Inline Hockey International Cup

FIRS World Championship

References 

Inline hockey in Iran
National inline hockey teams
Inline
Men's sport in Iran